Edward Sands is the name of:

 Edward F. Sands (born 1894), American murder suspect
 Edward Sands (politician) (c. 1760–1803), merchant and politician in New Brunswick